The First Sea Lord and Chief of the Naval Staff (1SL/CNS) is the military head of the Royal Navy and Naval Service of the United Kingdom. The First Sea Lord is usually the highest ranking and most senior admiral to serve in the British Armed Forces unless either the Chief or Vice-Chief of the Defence Staff are naval officers. Admiral Ben Key was appointed First Sea Lord in November 2021.

Originally titled the "Senior Naval Lord to the Board of Admiralty" when the post was created in 1689, the office was re-styled "First Naval Lord" in 1771. The concept of a professional "First Naval Lord" was introduced in 1805, and the title of the office was changed to "First Sea Lord" on the appointment of Sir John Fisher in 1904. Since 1923, the First Sea Lord has been a member of the Chiefs of Staff Committee; he now sits on the Defence Council and the Admiralty Board.

History
Lords Admiral were appointed from the 15th century; they were later styled Lords High Admiral until the 18th century, and Lords Commissioners of the Admiralty from the 17th century, as the governors of the English and later  British Royal Navy. From 1683 to 1684, there were seven paid Commissioners, and one unpaid supernumerary Commissioner. The number varied between five and seven Commissioners through the 18th century. The standing of all the Commissioners was in theory the same, although the First Commissioner or First Lord exercised an ascendancy over his colleagues from an early date.

The generally recognized office of Senior Naval Lord to the Board of Admiralty was established on 8 March 1689, with the first incumbent being Admiral Arthur Herbert; he was also First Lord of the Admiralty. On 20 January 1690 Admiral Herbert was succeeded by Admiral Sir John Chicheley under First Lord of Admiralty Thomas Herbert, Earl of Pembroke.

On 22 May 1702 the Board of Admiralty ceased control of Naval Affairs and was replaced by the Lord Admiral's Council. The previous office of Senior Naval Lord was replaced by a Senior Member to the Lords Admiral Council; he was usually a serving naval officer of Admiral rank and was the Chief Naval Adviser to the Lord Admiral. This lasted until 8 November 1709, when the Board of Admiralty resumed control of Naval Affairs and the post of Senior Naval Lord was resumed.

On 2 February 1771 the office of Senior Naval Lord was renamed to First Naval Lord. The first post holder was Vice-Admiral Augustus Hervey; he first served under First Lord of the Admiralty John Montagu, 4th Earl of Sandwich. In 1805, for the first time, specific functions were assigned to each of the 'Naval' Lords, who were described as 'Professional' Lords, leaving to the 'Civil' Lords the routine business of signing documents. On 2 May 1827 the Board of Admiralty once again ceased control of Naval Affairs and was replaced, until 1828, by a Lord High Admirals Council.

The title of the First Naval Lord was changed to First Sea Lord on the appointment of Sir Jackie Fisher in 1904. In 1917 the First Sea Lord was re-styled First Sea Lord and Chief of the Naval Staff. From 1923 onward, the First Sea Lord was a member of the Chiefs of Staff Committee, and from 1923 to 1959, in rotation with the representatives of the other services (the Chief of the Imperial General Staff and Chief of the Air Staff), he served as the chairman of that committee and head of all British armed forces. The title was retained when the Board of Admiralty was abolished in 1964 and the Board's functions were integrated into the Ministry of Defence.

Under the current organisation, the First Sea Lord sits on the Defence Council, the Admiralty Board and the Navy Board.

Since 2012, the flagship of the First Sea Lord has nominally been the ship of the line HMS Victory, which used to be Lord Nelson's flagship.

Appointees
The following table lists all those who have held the post of First Sea Lord or its preceding positions. Ranks and honours are as at the completion of their tenure:

|-style="text-align:center;"
!colspan=7|Senior Naval Lords

|-style="text-align:center;"
!colspan=7|First Naval Lords

|-style="text-align:center;"
!colspan=7|First Sea Lords

In fiction
In John Buchan's novel The Thirty-Nine Steps (1915), the First Sea Lord is named as Lord Alloa, an impostor whom Richard Hannay recognizes at a meeting as a spy and recent pursuer of his.  Hannay describes Lord Alloa as recognizable from news pictures for his "beard cut like a spade, the firm fighting mouth, the blunt square nose, and the keen blue eyes...the man, they say, that made the New British Navy". The real First Sea Lord at the time the story is set (early summer 1914) was Prince Louis of Battenberg, coincidentally also bearded.

H.M.S. Pinafore (1878), the operetta by Gilbert and Sullivan, has Sir Joseph Porter KCB as First Sea Lord. The show written and first performed in the late 1870s might be referencing or lampooning as First Sea Lords Sir Alexander Milne (1872-76), Sir Hastings Yelverton (1876-77), or Sir George Wellesley (1877-79).

See also
 Chief of the Defence Staff (United Kingdom)
 Second Sea Lord
 Third Sea Lord
 Fourth Sea Lord
 Fifth Sea Lord
Chief of the Air Staff - the Royal Air Force equivalent
Chief of the General Staff - the British Army equivalent

Notes

Citations

Sources

 
 
 
 

 

 

Ceremonial officers in the United Kingdom

Royal Navy appointments
United Kingdom